The 2020 Alabama Democratic presidential primary took place on March 3, 2020, as one of 15 contests scheduled on Super Tuesday in the Democratic Party primaries for the 2020 presidential election. The open primary allocated 52 pledged delegates towards the 2020 Democratic National Convention, distributed in proportion to the results of the primary, statewide and within each congressional district. The state was also given an additional 8 unpledged delegates (superdelegates), whose votes at the convention were not bound to the result of the primary.

Five candidates ran in this primary, including former vice president Joe Biden, senator Bernie Sanders from Vermont, former New York City mayor Michael Bloomberg, senator Elizabeth Warren from Massachusetts, and representative Tulsi Gabbard from Hawaii. Nine other candidates who withdrew prior to the contest were also on the ballot. Joe Biden won by an overwhelming landslide, winning every county and congressional district in the state. He received 63% of the vote and was awarded 44 delegates. Senator Sanders came in second place, with roughly 17% of the vote and 8 delegates. No other candidate received any delegates: Bloomberg missed the threshold with 12% and Warren only got 6%. All other candidates received under 1% of the vote.

Biden's landslide in the Yellowhammer State was unsurprising: The FiveThirtyEight forecast gave Biden a 92% chance of winning the state right before Super Tuesday. 49% of the Democratic electorate in Alabama is African American, a group that consistently backed Biden throughout the primary. Black voters gave him 72% of the vote per exit polls by CNN. In general, he performed best in Jefferson County, encompassing Birmingham, and counties in and around the heavily Democratic Black Belt. He also carried voters older than 65, which tend to back more moderate Democratic candidates and turn out in greater numbers, with 78%. Biden carried every other demographic except for voters aged 18 to 29, a traditionally progressive voting bloc that backed Sanders 46-30. Sanders was more competitive amongst white and rural voters, but they were insufficient in overcoming Biden's massive advantage in the state.

Procedure 
Alabama was part of 14 states and one territory holding primaries on March 3, 2020, also known as "Super Tuesday," having joined other southern states on the date after a bill signed on June 10, 2015 shifted the date.

Voting took place from 7 a.m. until 7 p.m CST. In the open primary, candidates had to meet a threshold of 15 percent at the congressional district or statewide level in order to be considered viable for delegates. The 52 pledged delegates to the 2020 Democratic National Convention were allocated proportionally on the basis of the results of the primary. Of these, between 3 and 8 were allocated to each of the state's 7 congressional districts and another 7 were allocated to party leaders and elected officials (PLEO delegates), in addition to 11 at-large delegates. The Super Tuesday primary as part of Stage I on the primary timetable received no bonus delegates, in order to disperse the primaries between more different date clusters and keep too many states from hoarding on the first shared date or on a March date in general.

Should presidential candidates have been allocated more delegates based on the results of the primary than delegate candidates presented, then supplemental delegates would be elected at caucuses on March 28, 2020. Regular national convention district delegates, whose names were electable on the primary ballot beneath the presidential candidates they were pledged for, were elected on the day of the primary and published on March 28, 2020. The state executive committee meeting was held on June 6, 2020, to vote on the 11 at-large and 7 pledged PLEO delegates for the Democratic National Convention; the meeting had been postponed from April 4, due to the COVID-19 pandemic. The delegation also included 8 unpledged PLEO delegates: 6 members of the Democratic National Committee and 2 members of Congress (senator Doug Jones and representative Terri Sewell).ref name="GP"/>

Candidates 
The following people filed for the presidential primary and were on the ballot in Alabama:

Running 

Joe Biden
Michael Bloomberg
Tulsi Gabbard
Bernie Sanders
Elizabeth Warren

Withdrawn

Michael Bennet
Cory Booker
Pete Buttigieg
Julian Castro
John Delaney
Amy Klobuchar
Tom Steyer
Marianne Williamson
Andrew Yang

There was an uncommitted option on the ballot, as well.

Fundraising 
According to the Federal Election Commission, between April 1, 2019 and November 23, 2020, Joe Biden raised $2,412,420.93 from Alabama-based contributions. Bernie Sanders raised $306,101.54, Michael Bloomberg raised $212.82, Elizabeth Warren raised $129,887.99, and Tulsi Gabbard raised $19,775.81.

Polling

Results

Results by county

Analysis 
Joe Biden's victory in Alabama was near-guaranteed. Four years earlier, Hillary Clinton carried the state with 77.84% against Bernie Sanders and won every county and congressional district, a feat repeated by Biden. FiveThirtyEight, which made state-by-state predictions prior to the primaries, gave Biden a 92% chance at winning the Yellowhammer State, a landslide over Sanders' 5% chance. Aggregate polling from FiveThirtyEight right before election day showed Biden up with 40.2%, Sanders at 18.4%, Bloomberg at 15.9%, Warren at 10.9%, Gabbard at 0.5%, and other/undecided 14.1%. 270toWin had Biden ahead as well with 44.5% of support, 23.5 percentage points ahead of Bernie Sanders at 21%.

The week before, Biden swept the South Carolina primary by a 28.88% margin over Sanders, reviving Biden's candidacy after crushing losses in Iowa, New Hampshire, and Nevada. Additionally, the moderate wing of the primary, consisting of former South Bend Mayor Pete Buttigieg, Senator Amy Klobuchar from Minnesota, representative Beto O'Rourke from Texas's 16th district, and Senator Kamala Harris from California coalesced behind and endorsed Biden while the progressive wing, consisting of Senators Sanders and Warren, remained fractured. Thus, right before Super Tuesday, Biden's support surged.

As with most states in the American South, the plurality – 49% – of Alabama's Democratic electorate is African American, and these voters backed Biden with 72% per exit polls by CNN. Biden's best performance, regionally, was in the Black Belt, a historically Democratic region due to high proportions of African Americans, which is attributable to the prominence of slavery in this region before emancipation. He carried the Birmingham/South Central region with 68%, and this region comprises 44% of the Democratic electorate in the state. Biden won voters 45 to 64 with 67% and those older than 65 with 78%. He also won all education groups, ideologies, and party affiliations.

Sanders' best performance was among young voters, a demographic group he dominated in both 2016 and 2020. He captured voters aged 18 to 29 with 46%, 16 points ahead of Biden. However, this win was futile to overcome Biden, as young voters are more inconsistent voters and their turnout decreased compared to 2016. According to the Brookings Institution, Alabama voters aged 17 to 29 comprised 14% of the Democratic primary vote share in 2016 but only 10% in 2020. While Biden carried every race and region, Sanders was most competitive among white voters (consist of 46% of the electorate and backing Biden 57-22), voters in the North (also backing Biden 57-22), rural voters (38% of the electorate and backing Biden 52-19), and Independents (23% of the electorate and backing Biden 51-24); Sanders performed well among these voting blocs in 2016, and did so again, yet was overshadowed by Biden's strength in the Deep South.

Ideological differences were also evident. Self identified liberals only supported the Vice President 55-24, but he overwhelmed moderates with 74% of the vote. Bloomberg actually came second in the moderate and conservative vote, capturing 10% and 22%, respectively, ahead of Sanders with 8% and 5%. Biden's margins were narrowest among voters which prioritized addressing income inequality, whom he won 53-26, and believe the Democratic nominee should "bring needed change," who backed Biden 52-25.  24% of voters believed the Democratic nominee should have more liberal policies than Barack Obama, and Senator Sanders – considered the most progressive in the contest – won this group 42-38, followed by Senator Warren carrying 12%.

On the same day, Biden carried all of the other southern Super Tuesday states of Arkansas, North Carolina, Oklahoma, Tennessee, Texas, and Virginia, and his upset victories in Maine, Massachusetts, and Minnesota catapulted him to frontrunner status. He would go on to lose the state in the general election, but retained his resounding victories among Black voters in the Black Belt.

Notes

See also
2020 Alabama Republican presidential primary

References

External links
The Green Papers delegate allocation summary
Alabama Democratic Party delegate selection plan
FiveThirtyEight Alabama primary poll tracker

Alabama Democratic
Democratic primary
2020